Itacuruba Sport Club, commonly known as Itacuruba, is a Brazilian football club based in Itacuruba, Pernambuco state. They competed in the Série C once.

History
The club was founded on August 2, 1987. They won the Campeonato Pernambucano Third Level in 2001, and the Campeonato Pernambucano Second Level in 2002. Itacuruba competed in the Série C in 2005.

Achievements

 Campeonato Pernambucano Second Level:
 Winners (1): 2002
 Campeonato Pernambucano Third Level:
 Winners (1): 2001

Stadium
Itacuruba Sport Club play their home games at Estádio Antônio Galdêncio Freire, nicknamed Galdenção. The stadium has a maximum capacity of 5,000 people.

References

Football clubs in Pernambuco
Association football clubs established in 1987
1987 establishments in Brazil